Following is a list of dams and reservoirs in Hawaii.

All major dams are linked below.

Dams and reservoirs in Hawaii 

This list is incomplete.  You can help Wikipedia by expanding it.

 Ka Loko Dam, Ka Loko Reservoir, privately owned (failed)
 Kualapuu Dam, Kualapuu Reservoir, State of Hawaii
 Wahiawa Dam, Wilson Reservoir

References 

 
 
Hawaii
Dams
Dams